Qaleh Sargodar (also Romanized as Qal‘eh Sargodār) is a village in Kuhestan Rural District, Rostaq District, Darab County, Fars Province, Iran. At the 2006 census, its population was 24, in 7 families.

References 

Populated places in Darab County